The Channel Islands cricket team was a cricket team which was formed from the combined teams of Jersey and Guernsey and representative of the Channel Islands as a whole.  The team briefly played Minor counties cricket when it played in the MCCA Knockout Trophy in 2001 and 2002.  The team played eight matches in total, though without success.  It lost seven matches while another was abandoned.  The team played four home matches, all of which took place at Grainville, Saint Saviour, Jersey.  Teams which played Minor Counties cricket at this time also took part in List A matches in the Cheltenham & Gloucester Trophy, although this was not the case with the Channel Islands.

A combined Channel Islands team previously played minor matches against a United England Eleven in 1866, 1867 and 1869.  It later appeared again in 1951 against the nomadic Arabs Cricket Club.

References

External links
Channel Islands at CricketArchive

National Counties cricket
Cricket in Jersey
Cricket in Guernsey
Sports organisations of the Channel Islands